Jean-Christophe Parisot de Bayard (20 June 1967 – 18 October 2020) was a French political scientist and disability activist with tetraplegia due to myopathy.

Early life and education
He was born in Douala, Cameroon. At ten he was diagnosed with limb-girdle muscular dystrophy. His two sisters also have this condition. In 1989 he became the first disabled student to graduate from the Sciences Po.

. In 1997 he established the National League of Disabled Students. He graduated in 1995 and became a doctor in political science.

Career
Parisot served as a ministerial delegate in the French Ministry of Employment and Disability Integration. He was also the president and founder of the Collectif des Démocrates Handicapés (Collective of Disabled Democrats). in 2002 and 2007 he ran for presidency just to show that disabled people also can take difficult tasks.

Parisot died on 18 October 2020 at the age of 53.

See also

List of disability rights activists
List of French people
List of physically disabled politicians
List of political scientists

References

External links
 Le site Force Citoyenne 
 Le collectif des démocrates handicapés

1967 births
20th-century French politicians
21st-century French politicians
French civil servants
French disability rights activists
French political scientists
2020 deaths
People from Douala
French politicians with disabilities
French male non-fiction writers
Scientists with disabilities